is a city located in Mie Prefecture, Japan. , the city had an estimated population of 16,232 in 8,746 households and a population density of 43 persons per km².

Geography
Kumano is located near the southern tip of the Kii Peninsula, in southern Mie Prefecture, facing the Pacific Ocean. Parts of the city are within the limits of the Yoshino-Kumano National Park.

Neighboring municipalities
Mie Prefecture
Owase
Mihama
Kihō
Wakayama Prefecture
Shingū
Kitayama
Nara Prefecture
Kamikitayama
Shimokitayama
Totsukawa

Climate
Kumano has a Humid subtropical climate (Köppen Cfa) characterized by warm summers and cool winters with light to no snowfall.

Demographics
Per Japanese census data, the population of Kumano has decreased steadily over the past 60 years.

History
The area of the modern city of Kumano was within ancient Kii Province and was part of the holdings of the Kii Tokugawa clan, and administered as part of the Kii-Shingū Domain in the Edo period. After the Meiji restoration, the town of Kinomoto was established within Minamimuro District with the early Meiji period creation of the modern municipalities system on April 1, 1889. The city of Kumano was established on November 3, 1954 by the merger of Kinomoto with the surrounding villages of Isato, Kamikawa, Arii, Atashika, Arasaki and Tomari (all from Minamimuro District).

On November 15, 2005, the town of Kiwa (also from Minamimuro District) was also merged into Kumano.

Government
Kumano has a mayor-council form of government with a directly elected mayor and a unicameral city council of 14 members. Kumano, collectively with the towns of Mihama of Kihō, contributes two members to the Mie Prefectural Assembly. In terms of national politics, the city is part of Mie 4th district of the lower house of the Diet of Japan.

Economy
The economy of Kumano is centered on commercial fishing, forestry and horticulture (oranges).

Education
Kumano has nine public elementary schools and seven public middle schools operated by the city government and one public high school operated by the Mie Prefectural Department of Education. The prefecture also operates one special education school for the handicapped..

Transportation

Railway
 JR Tōkai – Kisei Main Line
 -  -  -  -  -

Highway

Local attractions 
A portion of the Sacred Sites and Pilgrimage Routes in the Kii Mountain Range, a UNESCO World Heritage Site is located within Kumano.

Sister city relations
 – Sakurai, Nara, Japan, since October 1986
 – Bastos, Brazil, since December 1972 
 – Sorrento, Italy, since November 2001

Notable people
Hikoroku Arimoto - Olympic gymnast
Shigeru Kasamatsu – Olympic gymnast

References

External links
 
 
 
  

Cities in Mie Prefecture
Populated coastal places in Japan
Kumano, Mie